Belsky (masculine), Belskaya (feminine), or Belskoye (neuter) is the name of several rural localities in Russia:
Belsky, Beloretsky District, Republic of Bashkortostan, a village in Kaginsky Selsoviet of Beloretsky District of the Republic of Bashkortostan
Belsky, Karmaskalinsky District, Republic of Bashkortostan, a village in Sakhayevsky Selsoviet of Karmaskalinsky District of the Republic of Bashkortostan
Belsky, Meleuzovsky District, Republic of Bashkortostan, a village in Pervomaysky Selsoviet of Meleuzovsky District of the Republic of Bashkortostan
Belsky, Tver Oblast, a settlement in Vyshnevolotsky District of Tver Oblast
Belskoye, Republic of Bashkortostan, a selo in Alataninsky Selsoviet of Sterlitamaksky District of the Republic of Bashkortostan
Belskoye, Krasnoyarsk Krai, a selo in Troitsky Selsoviet of Pirovsky District of Krasnoyarsk Krai
Belskoye, Leningrad Oblast, a village in Osminskoye Settlement Municipal Formation of Luzhsky District of Leningrad Oblast
Belskoye, Moscow Oblast, a village in Guslevskoye Rural Settlement of Taldomsky District of Moscow Oblast
Belskoye, Ryazan Oblast, a selo in Belsky Rural Okrug of Spassky District of Ryazan Oblast
Belskoye, Smolensk Oblast, a village in Ponizovskoye Rural Settlement of Rudnyansky District of Smolensk Oblast
Belskoye, Tver Oblast, a village in Vesyegonsky District of Tver Oblast
Belskoye, Udmurt Republic, a village in Komsomolsky Selsoviet of Igrinsky District of the Udmurt Republic
Belskoye, Vologda Oblast, a village in Lukinsky Selsoviet of Chagodoshchensky District of Vologda Oblast
Belskaya, Kaluga Oblast, a village in Baryatinsky District of Kaluga Oblast
Belskaya, Tver Oblast, a village in Kalyazinsky District of Tver Oblast